The Escape in the Silent is an East German black-and-white film, directed by Siegfried Hartmann. It was released in 1966.

Plot
Construction works carried out in a small village in Thuringia reveal the corpse of a member of the Waffen-SS, who seems to have been buried during the end of the Second World War - although no fighting took place in the area. Two forensics experts from the People's Police Investigations Department, Stetter and Hoffmann, arrive in the village to determine the death cause. At first, they suspect the owner of the lands in which the body was discovered; but after questioning him, he is murdered. A golden coin they found leads them to a local woman named Helga, and they reveal the truth behind the matter.

Cast
 Fritz Diez as Stetter
 Dieter Wien as Hoffmann
 Marita Böhme as Helga Klink
 Regine Albrecht as Inge Klink
 Jiří Vršťala as Wills
 Hans-Joachim Hanisch as Zschunke
 Hans Hardt-Hardtloff as Schindler
 Karlheinz Liefers as priest
 Wolfgang Brunecker as Möller
 Rolf Ludwig as Karl Reinhold
 Horst Schön as SS man
 Ernst-Georg Schwill as police clerk
 Siegfried Weiß as jeweler
 Günter Sonnenberg as Heinz Klink
 Willi Neuenhahn as the wheelwright

Production
The script was based on Wolfgang Held's novel, The Death Pays with Ducats, published at 1964.

Reception
At 1966, Albert Wilkening wrote that "this thriller continues the honored tradition of DEFA, by combining the genre with contemporary issues, as well as an important historical and political background." The Eulenspiegel magazine's reviewer commented that "Finally... One must see the film, for the sake of the elusive culmination of its plot." The German Film Lexicon regarded it as "a criminal drama, the powerful statement of which is weakened by formalistic deficiencies."

References

External links
 Flucht ins Schweigen on the IMDb.
 Flucht ins Schweigen original poster on ostfilm.de.

1966 films
1966 crime films
German crime films
East German films
1960s German-language films
German black-and-white films
Police detective films
1960s German films